Aribashevo (Äri başı) is a rural locality (a selo) in Kudashevsky Selsoviet, Tatyshlinsky District, Bashkortostan, Russia. The population was 273 as of 2010. There are 2 streets.

Geography 
Aribashevo is located 9 km southwest of Verkhniye Tatyshly (the district's administrative centre) by road. Aribash is the nearest rural locality.

References 

Rural localities in Tatyshlinsky District